The 2018–19 Senegal Premier League is the 54th season (and 11th professional season) of the Senegal Premier League, the top-tier football league in Senegal. The season started on 3 November 2018.

Standings
Final table.

Stadiums

References

Senegal Premier League seasons
Senegal
1